The National Endowment for the Arts (NEA), every year honors up to seven jazz musicians with Jazz Master Awards. The National Endowment for the Arts Jazz Masters Fellowships are the self-proclaimed highest honors that the United States bestows upon jazz musicians. The award is usually given late in a performer's career after they have long established themselves.

NEA Jazz Masters

List adapted from the National Endowment for the Arts website.

1982: Roy Eldridge, Dizzy Gillespie, Sun Ra
1983: Count Basie, Kenny Clarke, Sonny Rollins
1984: Ornette Coleman, Miles Davis, Max Roach
1985: Gil Evans, Ella Fitzgerald, Jo Jones
1986: Benny Carter, Dexter Gordon, Teddy Wilson
1987: Cleo Patra Brown, Melba Liston, Jay McShann
1988: Art Blakey, Lionel Hampton, Billy Taylor
1989: Barry Harris, Hank Jones, Sarah Vaughan
1990: George Russell, Cecil Taylor, Gerald Wilson
1991: Danny Barker, Buck Clayton, Andy Kirk, Clark Terry
1992: Betty Carter, Dorothy Donegan, Harry "Sweets" Edison
1993: Milt Hinton, Jon Hendricks, Joe Williams
1994: Louie Bellson, Ahmad Jamal, Carmen McRae
1995: Ray Brown, Roy Haynes, Horace Silver
1996: Tommy Flanagan, Benny Golson, J. J. Johnson
1997: Billy Higgins, Milt Jackson, Anita O'Day
1998: Ron Carter, James Moody, Wayne Shorter
1999: Dave Brubeck, Art Farmer, Joe Henderson
2000: David Baker, Donald Byrd, Marian McPartland
2001: John Lewis, Jackie McLean, Randy Weston
2002: Frank Foster, Percy Heath, McCoy Tyner
2003: Jimmy Heath, Elvin Jones, Abbey Lincoln
2004: Jim Hall, Chico Hamilton, Herbie Hancock, Luther Henderson, Nat Hentoff, Nancy Wilson
2005: Kenny Burrell, Paquito D'Rivera, Slide Hampton, Shirley Horn, Artie Shaw, Jimmy Smith, George Wein
2006: Ray Barretto, Tony Bennett, Bob Brookmeyer, Chick Corea, Buddy DeFranco, Freddie Hubbard, John Levy
2007: Toshiko Akiyoshi, Curtis Fuller, Ramsey Lewis, Dan Morgenstern, Jimmy Scott, Frank Wess, Phil Woods
2008: Candido Camero, Andrew Hill, Quincy Jones, Tom McIntosh, Gunther Schuller, Joe Wilder
2009: George Benson, Jimmy Cobb, Lee Konitz, Toots Thielemans, Rudy Van Gelder, Snooky Young
2010: Muhal Richard Abrams, George Avakian, Kenny Barron, Bill Holman, Bobby Hutcherson, Yusef Lateef, Annie Ross, Cedar Walton
 2011: Hubert Laws, David Liebman, Johnny Mandel, Orrin Keepnews, and the Marsalis Family (Ellis Marsalis, Jr., Branford Marsalis, Wynton Marsalis, Delfeayo Marsalis, and Jason Marsalis)
 2012: Jack DeJohnette, Von Freeman, Charlie Haden, Sheila Jordan, Jimmy Owens
2013: Mose Allison, Lou Donaldson, Lorraine Gordon, Eddie Palmieri
2014: Jamey Aebersold, Anthony Braxton, Richard Davis, Keith Jarrett
2015: Carla Bley, George Coleman, Charles Lloyd, Joe Segal
2016: Gary Burton, Wendy Oxenhorn, Pharoah Sanders, Archie Shepp
2017: Dee Dee Bridgewater, Ira Gitler, Dave Holland, Dick Hyman, Lonnie Smith
2018: Pat Metheny, Dianne Reeves, Joanne Brackeen, Todd Barkan
2019: Bob Dorough, Abdullah Ibrahim, Maria Schneider, Stanley Crouch
2020: Dorthaan Kirk, Bobby McFerrin, Roscoe Mitchell, Reggie Workman
2021: Terri Lyne Carrington, Albert "Tootie" Heath, Phil Schaap, Henry Threadgill
2022: Billy Hart, Donald Harrison, Jr., Stanley Clarke, Cassandra Wilson

References

External links
 

Jazz awards
American music awards
National Endowment for the Arts
Fellowships